X Games Austin 2015 was an action sporting event that took place June 4–7, 2015, at the Circuit of the Americas in Austin, Texas.

This Summer X Games is the second in a row to be held in Austin and the third full X Games event to be held in the state of Texas; in 2003, a special "Global Championships" event was held in San Antonio, Texas.

The 2015 X Games are once again broadcast on ESPN and ABC. The event debuted three new events; Moto X Flat Track, Moto X Quarter Pipe and Big Air Doubles. This year, X Games Austin attracted 160,000 spectators over four days, making it the most attended X Games since 2004.

Results

Flat Track

Moto X

Skateboarding

BMX

Rallycross & Off-Road Truck

Medal table

Highlights

Even though he didn't medal in the event, Skateboarder Rony Gomes performed the first frontside 360 ollie in Skateboard Big Air history. Skateboarder Bob Burnquist wins his 8th Skateboard Big Air gold medal, the most all-time of any skateboarder in this event. Burnquist is also the most decorated skateboarder with 28 X Games gold medals. BMXer Colton Satterfield made history when he landed a double flair in BMX Big Air.

References

External links
X Games Austin 2015 – Official ESPN website

X Games
Festivals in Austin, Texas
2015 in American sports
2015 in rallying
2015 in motorcycle sport
2015 in multi-sport events
2015 in sports in Texas
2015 in esports
Sports in Austin, Texas
June 2015 sports events in the United States